The Republic Express was a passenger train operated by the Turkish State Railways. The train ran between Haydarpaşa Terminal in Istanbul and Ankara. After the Yüksek Hızlı Tren was put into service in 2009, the route of the Republic express was cut from Ankara to Eskişehir. On 31 January 2012, the Republic Express was discontinued due to the rehabilitation of the railway between Istanbul and Arifye and replaced with high speed service.

Gallery

References

External links
TCDD

Named passenger trains of Turkey